The  was a 6-car experimental Japanese Shinkansen train operated by Japanese National Railways (JNR) between 1973 and 1981.

Design
The Class 961 train was developed to test new technology and design features to be incorporated in future high-speed trains for use on the planned Tōhoku Shinkansen and Jōetsu Shinkansen routes in the north-east of Japan. It featured motors in all six cars and was designed to cope with operations in the cold and snowy conditions of north-eastern Japan.

A number of interior accommodation configurations were tested, including a restaurant car, compartments, and sleeping berths.

Formation
The set, designated "S3", was formed as follows.

961-1
Built by Kawasaki Heavy Industries. Standard seating car based on the 0 series configuration with 3+2-abreast flip-over reversible seating.

961-2
Built by Kawasaki Heavy Industries. Standard seating car based on the 0 series configuration.

961-3
Built by Nippon Sharyo. Restaurant car interior was added at Hamamatsu Works in 1974.

961-4
Built by Nippon Sharyo. Sleeping car accommodation was added at Hamamatsu Works in 1974, including 4-berth semi-open couchette compartments, longitudinally arranged sleeping berths and deluxe sleeping compartments.

961-5
Built by Hitachi. This car was used exclusively for test equipment. It had no side windows and instead had four large doorways on each side for installing and removing equipment.

961-6
Built by Hitachi. Standard seating car based on the 0 series configuration.

History
The train was unveiled on 9 July 1973.

Test running was suspended thereafter owing to the effects of the 1973 oil crisis.

The train was put into storage following the opening of the Sanyō Shinkansen extension in March 1975. 

On 11 May 1979, the Class 961 was transferred from storage at Ōi Depot in Tokyo (now JR Central's Tokyo No. 2 Shinkansen Depot) by road to the shinkansen depot at Oyama in Tochigi Prefecture for use on the "Oyama Test Track" section of the Tōhoku Shinkansen then under construction. Test running started on 5 June 1979, and the lettering "高速試験車" (High-Speed Test Train) was added to the nose section of the train from 9 June.

Following the opening of the Tōhoku Shinkansen in 1981, the Class 961's role as a test train ended, and it was stored at Sendai Shinkansen Depot. It was officially withdrawn on 10 August 1990.

Preservation

End cars 961-1 and 961-6 are preserved outdoors at Sendai Shinkansen Depot. These cars have been repainted into "Tōhoku Shinkansen" ivory and green livery. A brass plaque commemorating the world speed record of  set by this train in 1979 is displayed inside car 951-1 at Kokubunji in Tokyo.

References

Experimental and prototype high-speed trains
961
Train-related introductions in 1973
Hitachi multiple units
25 kV AC multiple units
Nippon Sharyo multiple units
Kawasaki multiple units